J. Shantha  is an Indian politician and a Member of Parliament in the 15th Lok Sabha of India. She represents the Bellary constituency of Karnataka and is a member of the Bharatiya Janata Party political party. She is the sister of B Sriramulu.

Early life and education
Shantha was born in Bellary, Karnataka. Her highest attained education is intermediate.

Political career
Shantha, is the elected Member of Parliament from a constituency which is reserved for scheduled tribe's candidates. She also contested 2018 by election from Ballari but lost by a huge margin of  votes.

Posts held

See also

15th Lok Sabha
Politics of India
Parliament of India
Government of India
Bellary
Bharatiya Janata Party

References 

India MPs 2009–2014
1973 births
Lok Sabha members from Karnataka
People from Bellary
People from Bellary district
Living people
Bharatiya Janata Party politicians from Karnataka
21st-century Indian women politicians
21st-century Indian politicians
Women members of the Karnataka Legislative Assembly